The Taipei Metro Xiaobitan station is a terminal station on the Xiaobitan branch line located in Xindian District, New Taipei, Taiwan.

Station overview

The station is an elevated station with four levels, elevated station has a side platform and two exits. Its platform length allows for a three-car, high capacity train. The station location is right next to the Xindian Depot, above the maintenance workshop and near Freeway 3

The entrance to the station and platform are situated on the fourth floor of the depot. The station covers an area of 3,000 square meters, while the platform is 70.5 meters long. Two escalators are located at the two entrances and are 14.45 meters high and 16.52 meters high; they are the second longest escalators in the system after those at Zhongxiao Fuxing.

Public Art
Public art at the station is themed "The Way to the Very Joyance", where the station design includes many elements designed to embrace nature. Pieces include "Time Jelly", a bronze piece shaped like melting toffee over a station wall, and "The Dancing Cloud", a plastic and steel piece situated on top of platform columns. Additional pieces include those in adjacent public squares around the station.

History
Construction began on 2 April 2001, and after four years of construction was completed on 30 September 2004. When the line first opened, some people complained about noise problems. Thus, sound-muffling walls were built along the tracks coming into the station.

Although the station platform only allows room for a three-car trainset, when the station was first opened a six-car trainset was used on the line. In this case, only the first three train cars' doors opened at this station (selective door operation). It was not until 22 July 2006 that a dedicated three-car trainset began service on the line.

Station layout

Around the station

 Xiaobitan Park
 Sunshine Sports Park

Gallery

References

Railway stations opened in 2004
2004 establishments in Taiwan
Songshan–Xindian line stations